Beryllium-8 (8Be, Be-8) is a radionuclide with 4 neutrons and 4 protons. It is an unbound resonance and nominally an isotope of beryllium. It decays into two alpha particles with a half-life on the order of 8.19 seconds. This has important ramifications in stellar nucleosynthesis as it creates a bottleneck in the creation of heavier chemical elements. The properties of 8Be have also led to speculation on the fine tuning of the Universe, and theoretical investigations on cosmological evolution had 8Be been stable.

Discovery 
The discovery of beryllium-8 occurred shortly after the construction of the first particle accelerator in 1932. Physicists John Douglas Cockcroft and Ernest Walton performed their first experiment with their accelerator at the Cavendish Laboratory in Cambridge, in which they irradiated lithium-7 with protons. They reported that this populated a nucleus with A = 8 that near-instantaneously decays into two alpha particles. This activity was observed again several months later, and was inferred to originate from 8Be.

Properties 

Beryllium-8 is unbound with respect to alpha emission by 92 keV; it is a resonance having a width of 6 eV. The nucleus of helium-4 is particularly stable, having a doubly magic configuration and larger binding energy per nucleon than 8Be. As the total energy of 8Be is greater than that of two alpha particles, the decay into two alpha particles is energetically favorable, and the synthesis of 8Be from two 4He nuclei is endothermic. The decay of 8Be is facilitated by the structure of the 8Be nucleus; it is highly deformed, and is believed to be a molecule-like cluster of two alpha particles that are very easily separated. Furthermore, while other alpha nuclides have similar short-lived resonances, 8Be is exceptionally already in the ground state. The unbound system of two α-particles has a low energy of the Coulomb barrier, which enables its existence for any significant length of time. Namely, 8Be decays with a half-life of 8.19 seconds.

8Be also has several excited states. These are also short-lived resonances, having widths up to several MeV and varying isospins, that quickly decay to the ground state or into two alpha particles.

Decay anomaly and possible fifth force 

A 2015 experiment by Attila Krasznahorkay et al. at the Hungarian Academy of Sciences's Institute for Nuclear Research found anomalous decays in the 17.64 and 18.15 MeV excited states of 8Be, populated by proton irradiation of 7Li. An excess of decays creating electron-positron pairs at a 140° angle with a combined energy of 17 MeV was observed. Jonathan Feng et al. attribute this 6.8-σ anomaly to a 17 MeV protophobic X-boson dubbed the X17 particle. This boson would mediate a fifth fundamental force acting over a short range (12 fm) and perhaps explain the decay of these 8Be excited states. A 2018 rerun of this experiment found the same anomalous particle scattering, and set a narrower mass range of the proposed fifth boson,  MeV/c2. While further experiments are needed to corroborate these observations, the influence of a fifth boson has been proposed as "the most straightforward possibility".

Role in stellar nucleosynthesis 
In stellar nucleosynthesis, two helium-4 nuclei may collide and fuse into a single beryllium-8 nucleus. Beryllium-8 has an extremely short half-life (8.19 seconds), and decays back into two helium-4 nuclei. This, along with the unbound nature of 5He and 5Li, creates a bottleneck in Big Bang nucleosynthesis and stellar nucleosynthesis, for it necessitates a very fast reaction rate. This impedes formation of heavier elements in the former, and limits the yield in the latter process. If the beryllium-8 collides with a helium-4 nucleus before decaying, they can fuse into a carbon-12 nucleus. This reaction was first theorized independently by Öpik and Salpeter in the early 1950s.

Owing to the instability of 8Be, the triple-alpha process is the only reaction in which 12C and heavier elements may be produced in observed quantities. The triple-alpha process, despite being a three-body reaction, is facilitated when 8Be production increases such that its concentration is approximately 10−8 relative to 4He; this occurs when 8Be is produced faster than it decays. However, this alone is insufficient, as the collision between 8Be and 4He is more likely to break apart the system rather than enable fusion; the reaction rate would still not be fast enough to explain the observed abundance of 12C. In 1954, Fred Hoyle thus postulated the existence of a resonance in carbon-12 within the stellar energy region of the triple-alpha process, enhancing the creation of carbon-12 despite the extremely short half-life of beryllium-8. The existence of this resonance (the Hoyle state) was  confirmed experimentally shortly thereafter; its discovery has been cited in formulations of the anthropic principle and the fine-tuned Universe hypothesis.

Hypothetical universes with stable 8Be 
As beryllium-8 is unbound by only 92 keV, it is theorized that very small changes in nuclear potential and the fine tuning of certain constants (such as α, the fine structure constant), could sufficiently increase the binding energy of 8Be to prevent its alpha decay, thus making it stable. This has led to investigations of hypothetical scenarios in which 8Be is stable and speculation about other universes with different fundamental constants. These studies suggest that the disappearance of the bottleneck created by 8Be would result in a very different reaction mechanism in Big Bang nucleosynthesis and the triple-alpha process, as well as alter the abundances of heavier chemical elements. As Big Bang nucleosynthesis only occurred within a short period having the necessary conditions, it is thought that there would be no significant difference in carbon production even if 8Be were stable. However, stable 8Be would enable alternative reaction pathways in helium burning (such as 8Be + 4He and 8Be + 8Be; constituting a "beryllium burning" phase) and possibly affect the abundance of the resultant 12C, 16O, and heavier nuclei, though 1H and 4He would remain the most abundant nuclides. This would also affect stellar evolution through an earlier onset and faster rate of helium burning (and beryllium burning), and result in a different main sequence than our Universe.

Notes

References 

Isotopes of beryllium
Nucleosynthesis